The June 18, 1961, race at Road America at Elkhart Lake, WI  was the sixth racing event of the eleventh season of the Sports Car Club of America's 1961 Championship Racing Series.

Results

References

External links
"Corvette News" magazine, 1961
"Road & Track" magazine 1961
Etceterini.com
RacingSportsCars.com
Dick Lang Racing History

June Sprints